Mangalore City South Assembly constituency is one of the Karnataka Legislative Assemblies or Vidhan Sabha constituencies in Karnataka. It is one of the three constituencies which represent Mangalore, others being Mangalore and Mangalore City North.

Mangalore South is part of Dakshina Kannada Lok Sabha constituency.

Members of Legislative Assembly

Election results

2018 
Constituency had a total of 11 contestants in 2018 election.

2013 
Constituency had a total of 13 contestants in 2013 election.

See also 
 Mangalore Assembly constituency
 Mangalore City North

References 

Assembly constituencies of Karnataka
Geography of Mangalore